Frank Fleming was a Gaelic footballer who played for the Mayo county team in their cup-winning season. He started Champion Fire Defences after retiring from the league.

References

Mayo inter-county Gaelic footballers
Living people
Year of birth missing (living people)